Namai is a mountain in the Lena-Angara Plateau, Irkutsk Oblast, Russian Federation.

Geography
It rises in the central/northeastern part of the plateau, above the right bank of the Kislaya River, west of the valley of the Khanda River, and northwest of Zhigalovo, in the central part of Irkutsk Oblast.

Mountaintops in the area of the plateau are flat and elevations moderate. The Namai is marked as a  summit in the N-48 sheet of the Soviet Topographic Map.

See also
List of mountains and hills of Russia

References

Mountains of Irkutsk Oblast
ceb:Gora Namay